Shane Van Dyke (born August 28, 1979) is an American actor, screenwriter, film director, television writer, and film producer. He is the son of Barry Van Dyke and grandson of Dick Van Dyke.

Early life
Van Dyke was born in Los Angeles, California, the son of Mary (née Carey) Van Dyke and actor Barry Van Dyke. He has two brothers, Wes and Carey, and a sister, Taryn Van Dyke. He is the paternal grandson of the entertainer Dick Van Dyke. He is also a grandnephew of Jerry Van Dyke and first cousin once removed of Jerry's daughter, Kelly Jean Van Dyke.

Van Dyke's professional acting career began after graduating from high school when he became involved with the theatre program at Moorpark College in California. He launched his television career with a recurring minor role (14 episodes) as medical student Alex Smith on the CBS television show Diagnosis: Murder. In 2002, he starred in the musical Annie.

Career
In the years following his role on Diagnosis: Murder, Van Dyke worked on other television shows including the long-running soap opera The Bold and the Beautiful, as well as the independent film Arizona Summer.

In the summer of 2007, Shane rejoined his grandfather and father in a series of Hallmark Channel Original Movies titled Murder 101. Around the same period, he also co-starred in the mini-series Shark Swarm, opposite John Schneider and Daryl Hannah.

Van Dyke has performed screenwriter duties for various films including Transmorphers 2, Street Racer, Paranormal Entity,  The Day the Earth Stopped and The Silence.

Van Dyke was the director and writer of the movie Titanic II (2010) and portrayed the ship's owner, Hayden Walsh. In 2011, Van Dyke appeared as a lifeguard in the SyFy film Super Shark, about a giant shark released from stone by an oil-drilling rig off the California coast. In 2012, he produced (with his brother Carey Van Dyke and Oren Peli) the horror film Chernobyl Diaries.

As of 2009, Van Dyke resides in Los Angeles and is a film and television faculty member with Hollywood for Kids.

In 2019, he and his brother Carey Van Dyke released a spec script titled Don't Worry Darling; the screenplay appeared on the 2019 Black List. A film based on the spec script was announced in August of that year, after a bidding war amongst 18 studios to acquire the project, set to be directed by Olivia Wilde; New Line Cinema won the auction, and the film was released in 2022. Katie Silberman was brought on to rewrite what became the film's screenplay.

Filmography

References

External links

Living people
1979 births
American male television actors
American male film actors
American male screenwriters
Male actors from Los Angeles County, California
20th-century American male actors
21st-century American male actors
Shane
Screenwriters from California